Ria Zmitrowicz (born 1990/1991) is an actress. She is known for her work in theatre, earning WhatOnStage and Manchester Theatre Award nominations, and her role in the BBC drama Three Girls (2017). She was named a 2018 BAFTA Breakthrough Brit.

Early life
Zmitrowicz was born in Spain and grew up in Surrey and Hampshire. She attended the Sixth Form College, Farnborough. She joined the National Youth Theatre (NYT) at sixteen and moved to London when she was eighteen.

Career
Playwright and actor Luke Barnes, whom Zmitrowicz met through the NYT, cast her in his play Chapel Street, which premiered at The Old Red Lion, Islington before going on to play at the Edinburgh Fringe Festival and the Bush Theatre. This helped Zmitrowicz secure an agent. She then landed a role in Arinzé Kene's God's Property alongside Kingsley Ben-Adir at Soho Theatre.

In 2013, Zmitrowicz played Wilma Grey in the two-part ITV crime drama Murder on the Home Front. She also had a recurring role as Jodie in the E4 comedy-drama series Youngers. The following year, she joined the cast of the sitcom The Midnight Beast as Hope for its second series, also on E4, and the ITV period drama Mr Selfridge as Sarah Ellis, a recurring role she would play for the latter three series.

In 2015, Zmitrowicz played Chloe Coverly in Arcadia with the English Touring Theatre and Mary Warren in The Crucible at the Royal Exchange, Manchester. The latter earned her a nomination at the Manchester Theatre Awards. She also appeared in Four Minutes Twelve Seconds. She made her feature film debut with a small role in Kill Your Friends.

Zmitrowicz starred as Amber Bowen, one of the titular victims, in the BAFTA-winning three-part BBC One miniseries Three Girls, based on a true story with the names changed.

Zmitrowicz starred in the plays Three Sisters with Pearl Chanda and Patsy Ferran and The Doctor with Juliet Stevenson at the Almeida Theatre in 2019, as well as The Welkin with Maxine Peake at the National Theatre in 2020. Her performance as Sami in The Doctor, a role she originated, earned Zmitrowicz a WhatsOnStage Award nomination for Best Supporting Actress in a Play. She returned to the Royal Court in 2022, starring in The Glow.

Zmitrowicz has an upcoming role in the Amazon Prime adaptation of Naomi Alderman's science fiction novel The Power.

Filmography

Film

Television

Stage

Awards and nominations

References

External links
 
 Ria Zmitrowicz at Curtis Brown
 Ria Zmitrowicz on BFI

Living people
Actresses from Hampshire
Actresses from Surrey
British stage actresses
British television actresses
National Youth Theatre members
Year of birth missing (living people)